Water & Power is a 2013 American crime-drama written and directed by Richard Montoya and starring Enrique Murciano, Nicholas Gonzalez, Clancy Brown, and Yvette Yates. The film is set in Latino-centric Eastside Los Angeles and was adapted from a stage play by Culture Clash.

Premise
Twin brothers nicknamed "Water" and "Power" from the Eastside streets of Los Angeles rise through the city's political and police ranks to become players in a complex and dangerous web of the powerful and corrupt of Los Angeles.

Cast
 Enrique Murciano as Gilbert aka "Water"
 Nicholas Gonzalez as Gabriel aka "Power"
 Clancy Brown as Turnvil
 Yvette Yates as Amy
 Emilio Rivera as Norte / Sur

Production
Water & Power began as a play by Montoya, premiering at the Mark Taper Forum in 2006.

It was shown at the National Association of Latino Independent Producers (NALIP) National Conference in June 2013, the Los Angeles Latino International Film Festival in October 2013, and was given a US theatrical release on 2 May 2014.

References

External links
 

2013 films
Films set in Los Angeles
Mexican-American culture in Los Angeles
2013 crime drama films
American neo-noir films
Mexican crime drama films
American crime drama films
2010s English-language films
2010s American films